Gelato University is a school in  Anzola dell'Emilia, near Bologna, Italy. It was set up by ice cream machine maker Carpigiani in 2003, with the aim of teaching students from around the world how to make gelato ice-cream.

History 
After the success following the invention of the Carpigiani brothers' first automatic gelato machine, the "Autogelatiera", in 1944, the Carpigiani Group was formed in 1946. Years later, they decided to start teaching the art of gelato. Thus, the Carpigiani Gelato University commenced in 2003.

Campus 
Carpigiani Gelato University's main campus lies in the heart of Italy. Many people from all around the world come into Gelato University, bringing with them various skills and knowledge of culture into the classrooms and labs. Due to its success rate and popularity from all around the world, the university offers courses in 12 different countries such as "Dubai, São Paulo and Kuala Lumpur". Plans for course offerings are also underway in other countries and online as well. Due to the University’s growing international population, classes are taught in "Italian, English, French and German".

Courses 

The university offers over 500 courses, costing around €800 ($1,138) and ranges from a few days  to five weeks in length (depending on course). Courses are available for beginners and experts. The various courses taught at Gelato University uniquely offer a broad range of education; from technical hands on work to the academics of food science. For instance, students would study different types of sugars and ingredients, consequently creating new and innovative recipes. Topics as specific as measuring "butter-fat-to-sugar ratio" content is learned.

See also 
 Carpigiani
 Gelato

References 

Ice cream
Cooking schools in Europe
Universities and colleges in Emilia-Romagna
Metropolitan City of Bologna
Educational institutions established in 2003
2003 establishments in Italy
Culture in Bologna